Üllar Kerde (born April 1, 1954) is an Estonian basketball coach. Currently he is the coach of BC Dynamo Moscow. He has also been the coach of Estonia national basketball team leading it to the EuroBasket 2001 which Estonia finished 14th.

Kerde was born in Tallinn, Estonia. In his club career, he coached Estonia's top team Tartu Ülikool/Rock and TTÜ KK. Kerde led Tartu Ülikool/Rock to EuroCup final four in 2007/2008 season and won the Estonian Championship title by beating BC Kalev/Cramo in four games.

References

External links
 at en.basketball

1965 births
Living people
Estonian basketball coaches
Basketball players from Tallinn
Estonia national basketball team coaches